Club Deportivo Arnedo is a football team based in Arnedo in the autonomous community of La Rioja. Founded in 1949, it plays in the Segunda División RFEF – Group 2. Its stadium is Sendero with a capacity of 5,000 seats.

History
In the 2017-18 season the club finished in the 13th position in the Tercera División, Group 16.

Season to season

2 seasons in Segunda División B
1 season in Segunda División RFEF
30 seasons in Tercera División
1 season in Tercera División RFEF

Famous players
 Antonio Güembe

References

External links
 
Futbolme team profile 
Profile on proyectos.larioja.com 

Football clubs in La Rioja (Spain)
Association football clubs established in 1949
1957 establishments in Spain